Abbie Magee (born 15 November 2000) is a Northern Irish footballer who plays as a defender and midfielder for Cliftonville and the Northern Ireland national team.

Playing career
Since 2017, Magee has played for Linfield in Northern Ireland's Women's Premiership, the top women's league in the country. During the 2019 season, she scored the game-winning goal against Sion Swifts Ladies on 18 April. She scored a goal against Cliftonville on 17 July, contributing to Linfield's 8–0 win.

In March 2022, Magee left Linfield and signed for Cliftonville.

International
Magee has represented Northern Ireland on the under-17, under-19, and senior national teams. At the age of 19, she made her debut for the Northern Ireland senior team in against Belarus on 27 October 2020, coming on as a substitute for Ashley Hutton. After making two appearances in wins against Belarus in the UEFA Women's Euro 2022 qualifying tournament, she was ruled out of play due to injury in late March 2021. Manager Kenny Shiels said of the disappointment, "at this moment in time she is our best player and this has been a hammer blow to her and to the team."

Honors
 with Linfield
 Women's Premiership: 2017, 2018, 2019, 2020 (runner-up)
 IFA Women's Challenge Cup: 2020 (runner-up), 2019 (runner-up), 2018 (runner-up)
 Women's Premiership League Cup: 2018

References

External links
 
 
 Profile at Cliftonville

2000 births
Living people
Women's association football midfielders
Women's association footballers from Northern Ireland
Northern Ireland women's international footballers
Linfield Ladies F.C. players
Cliftonville F.C. players
Women's Premiership (Northern Ireland) players
UEFA Women's Euro 2022 players